Since the mid 1980s, the largest source of electricity in France is Nuclear power, with a generation of 379.5 TWh in 2019 and a total electricity production of . In 2018, the nuclear share was 71.67%, the highest percentage in the world.

Since June 2020, it has 56 operable reactors totalling 61,370 MWe, one under construction (1630 MWe), and 14 shut down or in decommissioning (5,549 MWe). In May 2022, EDF reported that twelve reactors were shut down and being inspected for stress corrosion, requiring EDF to adjust its French nuclear output estimate for 2022 to 280-300 TWh; the estimate of the impact of the decrease in output on the Group's EBITDA for 2022 was assessed to be -€18,5 billion.

Électricité de France (EDF)the country's main electricity generation and distribution company – manages the country's 56 power reactors. EDF is substantially owned by the French Government, with around 85% shares in government hands.

Nuclear power was introduced in large quantities in France following the 1973 oil crisis according to the Messmer plan. This was based on projections that large amounts of electric power would be required. In the end too much nuclear power capacity was installed, and this has led to relatively low production, load following, and high electricity exports. France exported  of electricity to its neighbours in 2017. However, the country still becomes a net importer of electricity when demand exceeds supply, such as in cases of very inclement weather, like in February 2012 when "Germany powers France in cold despite nuclear u-turn" as "France heavily relies on electric heating", which "means that during cold snaps, French electricity demand goes through the roof, forcing the country to import".

History
France has a long relationship with nuclear power, starting with Henri Becquerel's discovery of natural radioactivity in the 1890s and continued by famous nuclear scientists such as Pierre and Marie Skłodowska Curie.

Before World War II, France had been mainly involved in nuclear research through the work of the Joliot-Curies. In 1945 the Provisional Government of the French Republic (GPRF) created the Commissariat à l'Énergie Atomique (CEA) governmental agency, and Nobel prize winner Frédéric Joliot-Curie, member of the French Communist Party (PCF) since 1942, was appointed high commissioner. He was relieved of his duties in 1950 for political reasons contingent upon the Cold War, and later was one of the 11 signatories to the Russell-Einstein Manifesto in 1955. The CEA was created by Charles de Gaulle on 18 October 1945. Its mandate is to conduct fundamental and applied research into many areas, including the design of nuclear reactors, the manufacturing of integrated circuits, the use of radionuclides for medical treatments, seismology and tsunami propagation, and the safety of computerized systems.

Nuclear research was discontinued for a time after the war, owing to the instability of the Fourth Republic and the lack of finances available. However, in the 1950s a civil nuclear research program was started, a by-product of which was plutonium. A secret Committee for the Military Applications of Atomic Energy was formed in 1956, and a development program for delivery vehicles started. In 1957, soon after the Suez Crisis and the diplomatic tension with both the USSR and the United States, French president René Coty decided on the creation of the C.S.E.M. in what was then French Sahara, a new nuclear testing facility replacing the CIEES testing facility. See France and nuclear weapons.

The first nuclear power plants in France were three UNGG reactors at the Marcoule Nuclear Site between 1956 and 1960, followed by the Chinon reactors in Avoine from 1962.

Messmer Plan
As a direct result of the 1973 oil crisis, on 6 March 1974 Prime Minister Pierre Messmer announced what became known as the 'Messmer Plan', a huge nuclear power program aimed at generating all of France's electricity from nuclear power. At the time of the oil crisis most of France's electricity came from foreign oil. Nuclear power allowed France to compensate for its lack of indigenous energy resources by applying its strengths in heavy engineering. The situation was summarized in a slogan: "In France, we do not have oil, but we have ideas."

The announcement of the Messmer Plan was enacted without public or parliamentary debate. Concern over the government's action spread among the scientific community of France. The lack of consultation outside of political realms regarding the plan led to the formation of the Groupement des scientifiques pour l'information sur l'énergie nucléaire (Association of Scientists for Information on Nuclear Energy). 4,000 scientists signed a petition as a response, known as the Appeal of the 400 after the 400 scientists who initially signed it.

The reason that the Messmer Plan was enacted without public or parliamentary debate, was because that there was no tradition to do that with highly-technological and strategically-important decisions in the governments of France and the parliament did not have a scientific commission with sufficient technical means to handle such scientific and strategic decisions, just like the public does not have such means.
France does not have any procedure of public inquiries to allow the assessment of major technological programmes. The plan envisaged the construction of around 80 nuclear plants by 1985 and a total of 170 plants by 2000. Work on the first three plants, at Tricastin, Gravelines, and Dampierre started the same year and France installed 56 reactors over the next 15 years. 

However by the mid 1980s it became clear that the Messmer plan had been overambitious. Nuclear power plants achieve their optimum economic value when run flat out, and the projected demand had not materialized. By 1988 France's nuclear power plants had a capacity factor of only around 60%, whereas other countries that had not invested in nuclear power so heavily were nearer 80-90%.

Developments 2011-2021
Following the 2011 Fukushima I nuclear accidents, the head of France's nuclear safety agency said that France needed to upgrade the protection of vital functions in all its nuclear reactors to avoid a disaster in the event of a natural calamity, adding there was no need to close any plants. "There is a need to add a layer to protect safety mechanisms in reactors that are vital for the protection of the reactor such as cooling functions and electric powering", Jacques Repussard, head of the IRSN, said. Opinion polls showed support for atomic energy had dropped since Fukushima. Forty percent of the French "are 'hesitant' about nuclear energy while a third are in favor and 17 percent are against, according to a survey by pollster Ifop published November 13".

In February 2012, President Sarkozy decided to extend the life of existing nuclear reactors beyond 40 years, following the Court of Audit decision that that would be the best option, for new nuclear capacity or other forms of energy would be more costly and available too late. Within ten years 22 out of the 58 reactors will have been operating for over 40 years. Generation costs from the new Flamanville European Pressurized Reactor (EPR) are estimated to be at least in the 70-to-90 EUR/MWh range, depending on construction outcome. Academics at Paris Dauphine University forecast that domestic electricity prices would rise by about 30% by 2020.

Following François Hollande's victory in the 2012 presidential election, it was thought that there might be a partial nuclear phaseout in France. This followed a national debate in the run-up to the election, with President Nicolas Sarkozy backing nuclear power and François Hollande proposing a cut in nuclear power's electricity contribution by more than a third by 2025. It seemed certain that Hollande would at least order the closure of the Fessenheim Nuclear Power Plant by 2017 where there has been an ongoing closure campaign due to concerns about seismic activity and flooding.

Active efforts by the French government to market the EPR have been hampered by cost overruns, delays, and competition from other nations, such as South Korea, which offer simpler, cheaper reactors.

In 2015, the National Assembly voted that by 2025 only 50% of France's energy will be produced by nuclear plants. Environment Minister Nicolas Hulot noted in November 2017 that this goal is unrealistic, postponing the reduction to 2030 or 2035.

In 2016, following a discovery at Flamanville Nuclear Power Plant, about 400 large steel forgings manufactured by Le Creusot Forge since 1965 were found to have carbon-content irregularities that weakened the steel. A widespread programme of reactor checks was started involving a progressive programme of reactor shutdowns, continued over the winter high electricity demand period into 2017. This caused power price increases in Europe as France increased electricity imports, especially from Germany, to augment supply. As of late October 2016, 20 of France's 58 reactors were offline. These steel quality concerns may prevent the regulator giving the life extensions from 40 to 50 years, that had been assumed by energy planners, for many reactors. In December 2016 the Wall Street Journal characterised the problem as a "decades long coverup of manufacturing problems", with Areva executives acknowledging that Le Creusot had been falsifying documents. The Le Creusot forge was out of operation from December 2015 to January 2018 while improvements to process controls, the quality management system, organisation and safety culture were made.

In November 2018, President Macron announced the 50% nuclear power reduction target is being delayed to 2035, and would involve closing fourteen  reactors. The two oldest reactors, units 1 and 2 at Fessenheim, were closed in 2020. EDF is planning an investment programme, called Grand Carénage, to extend reactor lifespans to 50 years, to be largely completed by 2025.

In 2020, Energy Minister Élisabeth Borne announced the government would not decide on the construction of any new reactors until Flamanville 3 started operation after 2022. In October 2021 president Macron announced plans for France to become a leader in low-carbon energy production using small modular reactors and green hydrogen. In October 2021 French grid operator RTE plans for construction of six new EPR reactors so that by 2050 France maintains 50 GW in low-carbon nuclear power. This has been described as the fastest and most certain path to achieve carbon neutrality by 2050.

In January 2022, junior environment minister Bérangère Abba said that plans for new nuclear EPR 2 reactors, to be operational between 2035 and 2037, should be submitted around 2023. The decision was accelerated by the impact of 2021 global energy crisis. In February 2022 president Macron added that the plan includes construction of 14 new large nuclear reactors and extension of life of existing reactors deemed safe and suitable beyond 50 years.

On the 3rd of September 2022 amid energy uncertainties arising from the 2022 Russian invasion of Ukraine, the Energy Transition Minister, Agnes Pannier-Runacher, announced that EDF was committed to restarting all reactors in the coming winter.

Crisis since late 2021 
After scheduled maintenance during the summer of 2021, some power plants were not back in service in late 2021. In October, Stress corrosion cracking at Civaux Nuclear Power Plant led to the decision to shut down both blocks for long term repair. In December 2021, this was extended to both blocks of Chooz Nuclear Power Plant, as all four plants use the same type of reactor, N4, the most modern in operation, with grid connection in the late 1990s, commercial operation since early 2000s. By end of April 2022 it was reported that 28 of France’s 56 nuclear reactors were offline. French nuclear energy production has fallen to the lowest level since 1993 and it is expected to fall short by at least 25% compared to usual production levels in the winter of 2022/2023.

As of February 2022, EDF expected 2022 production to be 295–315 TWh, and 300–330 TWh for 2023.

On 19 May 2022, EDF adjusted its French nuclear output estimate for 2022 between 280 and 300 TWh, and with the expectation of checks and repairs to be completed, the 2023 French nuclear output estimate was not changed (300–330 TWh). Considering the overall control and repair program, nuclear generation for 2024 may be impacted.

On 21 February 2022, S&P Global Ratings and Moody's downgraded the credit rating of EDF citing the technical issues at its nuclear power plants. In July 2022 the French government announced its plans to fully nationalize EDF.

As of early September 2022, 32 of France's 56 nuclear reactors were shut down due to maintenance or technical problems. In 2022, Europe's driest summer in 500 years had serious consequences for power plant cooling systems, as the drought reduced the amount of river water available for cooling.

Management and economics
Électricité de France (EDF)the country's main electricity generation and distribution companymanages the country's nuclear power plants. EDF is substantially owned by the French government, with around 85% of EDF shares in government hands. 78.9% of Areva shares are owned by the French public sector company CEA and are therefore in public ownership. EDF remains heavily in debt. Its profitability suffered during the recession which began in 2008. It made €3.9 billion in 2009, which fell to €1.02 billion in 2010, with provisions set aside amounting to €2.9 billion. The Nuclear industry has been accused of significant cost overruns and failing to cover the total costs of operation, including waste management and decommissioning.

In 2001, nuclear construction and services company Areva was created by the merger of CEA Industrie, Framatome and Cogema (now Areva NC). Its main shareholder is the French owned company CEA, but the German federal government also holds, through Siemens, 34% of the shares of Areva's subsidiary, Areva NP, in charge of building the EPR (third-generation nuclear reactor).

In 2010, as part of the progressive liberalisation of the energy market under EU directives, France agreed the Accès régulé à l'électricité nucléaire historique (ARENH) regulations that allowed third party suppliers access up to about a quarter of France's pre-2011 nuclear generation capacity, at a fixed price of €42/MWh from 1 July 2011 until 31 December 2025.

As of 2015, France's household electricity price, excluding taxation, is the 12th cheapest amongst the 28 member European Union and the second-cheapest to industrial consumers. The actual cost of generating electricity by nuclear power is not published by EDF or the French government but is estimated to be between €59/MWh and €83/MWh.

EDF said its third-generation nuclear reactor EPR project at its Flamanville, northern France, plant will be delayed until 2016, due to "both structural and economic reasons," which will bring the project's total cost to EUR8.5 billion. Similarly, the cost of the Olkiluoto Nuclear Power Plant (EPR) to be built in Finland has escalated. Areva and the utility involved "are in bitter dispute over who will bear the cost overruns and there is a real risk now that the utility will default. EDF has suggested that if the political environment causes the EPR costs to overrun, the design would be replaced with a cheaper and simpler Franco-Japanese design, the Atmea for which the design will be completed by 2013, or the already operating Franco-Chinese design, the CPR-1000." In July 2018, EDF further delayed fuel loading to Q4 2019 and increased the project's cost estimate by a further €400 million (US$467.1 million). Startup is now scheduled to occur no earlier than Q2 2020 and EDF now estimates project costs at €10.9 billion (US$12.75 billion), three times the original cost estimates. Hot testing is currently planned to occur by the end of 2018

In July 2015, EDF agreed to take a majority stake in Areva NP, following a French government instruction they create a "global strategic partnership".

In 2016, the European Commission assessed that France's nuclear decommissioning liabilities were seriously underfunded, with only 23 billion euros of earmarked assets to cover 74.1 billion euros of expected decommissioning costs.

In October 2019, French Finance Minister Bruno Le Maire released an audit report on the construction of the heavily delayed and nearly four times over-budget Flamanville 3 EPR development, started by Areva in 2007, which assessed it as largely a project management and skills failure. The Finance Minister demanded EDF present within a month an action plan for the project, calling it "a failure for the entire French nuclear industry".

In 2020, the French government announced plans to change the wholesale nuclear power market, to enable EDF to completely cover its costs while preventing price volatility. A "price corridor" with floor and ceiling price limits would be defined for wholesale nuclear power electricity, rather than the current fixed €42/MWh for a quarter of production, which third-party suppliers used to avoid peak period high prices. A price band of €42-48/MWh has been suggested, though pricing would be controlled by regulator Commission de régulation de l'énergie (CRE). Some prefer a higher price band to finance new nuclear builds to replace older reactors, for example Francois Dos Santos of the EDF central works council suggested a €47-53/MWh price band.

EDF has a programme, named Grand Carénage and costed at €49.4 billion, to life extend by 2025 nearly all French power reactors from 40 to 50 years lifetime. These have been approved by regulatory body ASN in February 2021.

Technical overview

Drawing such a large percentage of overall electrical production from nuclear power is unique to France. This reliance has resulted in certain necessary deviations from the standard design and function of other nuclear power programs. For instance, in order to meet changing demand throughout the day, some plants must work as peaking power plants, whereas most nuclear plants in the world operate as base-load plants, and allow other fossil or hydro units to adjust to demand. Nuclear power in France has a total capacity factor of around 77%, which is low compared to nuclear power plants in other countries due to load following. Fleet availability has been declining in recent years, averaging approximately 72% over the 2020-2021 operating years.  This is quite low compared to other, less dominant nuclear plant fleets and suggests the operating regime has had adverse long-term impacts on the operability of the fleet.

The first eight power reactors in the nation were gas cooled reactor types (UNGG reactor), whose development was pioneered by CEA. Coinciding with a uranium enrichment program, EDF developed pressurized water reactor (PWR) technology which eventually became the dominant type. The gas-cooled reactors located at Brennilis, Bugey, Chinon, and Marcoule have all been shut down.

All operating plants today are PWRs. The sodium-cooled fast breeder reactor technology development reactors, Phénix and Superphénix, have been shut down. Work on a more advanced design in the form of the ASTRID reactor was finally abandoned in September 2019.

The PWR plants were all developed by Framatome (now Areva) from the initial Westinghouse design. All currently operating PWR plants are of three design variations, having output powers of 900 MWe, 1300 MWe, and 1450 MWe. The repeated use of these standard variants of a design has afforded France the greatest degree of nuclear plant standardization in the world.

900 MWe class (CP0, CP1 and CP2 designs)

There are a total of 34 of these reactors in operation; most were constructed in the 1970s and the early 1980s. In 2002, they had a uniform review and all were granted a 10-year life extension.

With the CP0 and CP1 designs, two reactors share the same machine and command room. With the CP2 design, each reactor has its own machine and command room. Apart from this difference, CP1 and CP2 use the same technologies, and the two types are frequently referred to as CPY. Compared to CP0 they have an additional cooling circuit between the emergency system that in case of an accident allows to spray water into the containment and the circuit which contains river water, a more flexible control system and some minor difference in the layout of the building.

This three loop design (three steam generators and three primary circulation pumps) was also exported to a number of other countries, including:

 South Africa – two units at the Koeberg nuclear power station
 South Korea – two units at the Ulchin Nuclear Power Plant
 China, also designated as M310: 
 Two units at the Daya Bay Nuclear Power Plant
 Two units at the Ling Ao Nuclear Power Plant
 Further development led into the 1000 MW CPR-1000 design.

In February 2021, Autorité de sûreté nucléaire gave generic authorisation, subject to conditions, for a ten-year life extension beyond the design life of 40 years of the French 900 MWe reactors. Specific reviews of each reactor are still required.

1300 MWe class (P4 and P'4 designs)

There are 20 reactors of this design (four steam generators and four primary circulation pumps) operating in France. The P4 and P'4 type have some minor difference in the layout of the building, especially for the structure which contain the fuel rods and the circuitry.

1500 MWe class (N4 design)

There are only four of these reactors, housed at two separate sites: Civaux and Chooz. Construction of these reactors started between 1984 and 1991, but full commercial operation did not begin until between 2000 and 2002 because of thermal fatigue flaws in the heat removal system requiring the redesign and replacement of parts in each N4 power station. By 2002 the reactors had been uprated from 1450 MWe to 1500 MWe.

1650 MWe class (EPR design)
The next generation design for French reactors is the EPR, which is also intended for foreign markets. The EPR was originally developed as a German-French joint project to incorporate the advantages of the highly reliable German Konvoi design as well as French experience at mass construction of relatively "standardized" nuclear facilities. The design was intended to be built in both Germany and France as well as various export markets. However, the German nuclear phase-out precluded any construction of EPRs in Germany and ultimately led to Siemens selling its shares in the joint venture (see below). Two EPR units are in operation at the Taishan Nuclear Power Plant in China. Operational units include one at the Olkiluoto Nuclear Power Plant in Finland. Under construction units include two at the Hinkley Point C nuclear power station in the United Kingdom. Construction of the first French EPR started at the Flamanville Nuclear Power Plant in 2007. The completion date was set for 2012, but the reactor suffered delays and cost overruns. , completion was scheduled for late 2022, ten years behind schedule. 
An additional EPR reactor was planned for the Penly Nuclear Power Plant, but this project has now been abandoned.

The reactor design was developed by Areva contributing its N4 reactor technology and the German company Siemens contributing its Konvoi reactor technology. In keeping with the French approach of highly standardized plants and proven technology, it uses more traditional active safety systems and is more similar to current plant designs than international competitors such as the AP1000 or the ESBWR.

In 2013, EDF acknowledged the difficulties it was having building the EPR design. In September 2015, EDF's chief executive, Jean-Bernard Lévy, stated that the design of a "New Model" EPR was being worked on, which will be easier and cheaper to build, which would be ready for orders from about 2020. In 2016 EDF planned to build two New Model EPR reactors in France by 2030 to prepare for renewing its fleet of older reactors. However following financial difficulties at Areva, and its merger with EDF, French Energy Minister Nicolas Hulot said in January 2018 "for now [building a New Model EPR] is neither a priority or a plan. Right now the priority is to develop renewable energy and to reduce the share of nuclear."

Cooling

The majority of nuclear plants in France are located away from the coasts and obtain their cooling water from rivers. These plants employ cooling towers to reduce their impact on the environment. The temperature of emitted water carrying the waste heat is strictly limited by the French government, and this has proved to be problematic during recent heat waves.

Five plants, equaling 18 reactors are located on the coast:

 Gravelines Nuclear Power Station
 Penly Nuclear Power Plant
 Paluel Nuclear Power Plant
 Flamanville Nuclear Power Plant
 Blayais Nuclear Power Plant

These five get their cooling water directly from the ocean and can thus dump their waste heat directly back into the sea, which is slightly more economical.

Fuel cycle

France is one of the few countries in the world with an active civilian nuclear reprocessing program, with the COGEMA La Hague site. Enrichment work, some MOX fuel fabrication, and other activities take place at the Tricastin Nuclear Power Centre. Enrichment is completely domestic and is powered by 2/3 of the output of the nuclear plant at Tricastin. Reprocessing of fuel from other countries has been done for the United States and Japan, who have expressed the desire to develop a more closed fuel cycle similar to what France has achieved. MOX fuel fabrication services have also been sold to other countries, notably to the US for the Megatons to Megawatts Program, using plutonium from dismantled nuclear weapons. After the cancellation of German plans to build a nuclear fuel reprocessing plant at Wackersdorf, Germany, also relied on the La Hague facility for its civilian reprocessing before switching to the once thru fuel cycle in 2005.

While France does not mine uranium for the front end of the fuel cycle domestically, French companies have various holdings in the uranium market. Uranium for the French program totalled 8000 tonnes annually as of 2014. Areva is involved in uranium mining operations in Canada, Kazakhstan, Namibia, and Niger. Several French former colonies have significant uranium reserves and French companies have stayed active in many of them even after those countries became independent. Due to the CFA Franc countries having a currency peg first to the French Franc and now to its successor, the euro, economic relations between these former French colonies and their former metropole remain strong.

Final disposal of the high level nuclear waste is planned to be done at the Meuse/Haute Marne Underground Research Laboratory deep geological repository.

Operational considerations
France's nuclear reactors comprise 90 per cent of EDFs capacity and so they are used in load-following mode and some reactors close at weekends because there is no market for the electricity. This means that the capacity factor is low by world standards, usually in the high seventies as a percentage, which is not an ideal economic situation for nuclear plants.

During periods of high demand EDF has been routinely "forced into the relatively expensive spot and short-term power markets because it lacks adequate peak load generating capacity". France heavily relies on electric heating, with about one third of existing and three-quarters of new houses using electric space heating due to the low off-peak tariffs offered. Due to this residential heating demand, about 2.3 GW of extra power is needed for every degree Celsius of temperature drop. This means that during cold snaps, French electricity demand increases dramatically, forcing the country to import at full capacity from its neighbours during peak demand. For example, in February 2012, Germany "came to the rescue of France during last week's cold snap by massively exporting electricity to its neighbour".

All but five of EDFs plants are inland and require fresh water for cooling. Eleven of these fifteen inland plants have cooling towers, using evaporative cooling, while the others use lake or river water directly. In very hot summers, generation output may be restricted.

In 2008, nuclear power accounted for 16% of final energy consumption in France. As is common in all industrialized nations, fossil fuels still dominate energy consumption, particularly in the transportation and heating sectors. 
However, nuclear constitutes a higher level of total energy consumption in France than in any other country. 
In 2001, nuclear power accounted for 37% of the total energy consumption in France. 

Import and export
The heavy investment in nuclear power energy requires electricity export when French electricity demand is low, or low-price dumping in the French market, and encourages the use of electricity for space heating and water heating.

France on a net basis exported  of electricity to its neighbours in the second half of 2021. However, the country relied on imports from Spain and Belgium at the end of 2021 due to cold weather and multiple outages at it nuclear plants.

Accidents and incidents

In July 2008, 18,000 litres (4,755 gallons) of uranium solution containing natural uranium were accidentally released from Tricastin Nuclear Power Centre. Due to cleaning and repair work the containment system for a uranium solution holding tank was not functional when the tank filled. The inflow exceeded the tank's capacity and 30 cubic metres of uranium solution leaked, with 18 cubic metres spilled on the ground. Testing found elevated uranium levels in the nearby Gaffière and Lauzon rivers. The liquid that escaped to the ground contained about 75 kg of natural uranium, which is toxic as a heavy metal, but only slightly radioactive. Estimates for the releases were initially higher, up to 360 kg of natural uranium, but revised downward later. French authorities banned the use of water from the Gaffière and Lauzon for drinking and watering of crops for 2 weeks. Swimming, water sports and fishing were also banned. This incident has been classified as Level 1 (anomaly) on the International Nuclear Event Scale. Shortly after the first incident, approximately 100 employees were exposed to minor doses of radiation (1/40 of the annual limit) due to a piping failure.

In October 2017, EDF announced it would repair fire safety system pipes at 20 nuclear reactors to increase seismic safety after discovering thinning metal in some sections of pipes. EDF classified this as a Level 2 (incident) on the International Nuclear Event Scale.

Nuclear safety
In 2006, the Autorité de sûreté nucléaire (ASN) was created as the independent French nuclear safety regulator, replacing the General Direction for Nuclear Safety and Radioprotection.

In 2012, the ASN released a report announcing a sweeping safety upgrade to all the country's reactors. The ASN's report states plainly that a loss of coolant or electricity could, in the worst cases, see meltdowns at nuclear reactors in hours. It also lists many shortcomings found during 'stress tests', in which some safety aspects of plants were found not to meet existing standards. It will now require all power plants to build a set of safety systems of last resort, contained in bunkers that will be hardened to withstand more extreme earthquakes, floods and other threats than plants themselves are designed to cope with. It will also adopt a proposal by EDF to create an elite force that is specifically trained to tackle nuclear accidents and could be deployed to any site within hours. Both moves are a response to the Fukushima nuclear disaster.

Seismicity

Following the 2011 Fukushima I nuclear accidents, there has been an increased focus on the risks associated with seismic activity in France, with particular attention focused on the Fessenheim Nuclear Power Plant.

General seismic risk in France is categorised on a five-point scale, with zone 1 being very low risk, through to zone 5 in areas with a 'very strong' risk. In Metropolitan France the areas of highest risk are rated at 4, 'strong', and are located in the Pyrenees, Alps, the south of the Haut-Rhin département, the Territoire de Belfort and a few communes in Doubs. A new zoning map comes into force on 1 May 2011, which significantly increases the rating for many areas. The major nuclear research facilities at Cadarache are located in a zone 4 area near the fault that caused the 1909 Lambesc earthquake, while the Marcoule research centre and the nuclear power plants at Tricastin, Cruas, Saint-Alban, Bugey and Fessenheim (near the fault that caused the 1356 Basel earthquake) are all within zone 3. A further six plants lie within zone 2.

The current process for evaluating the seismic hazard for a nuclear plant is set out in Règle Fondamentale de Sûreté (Fundamental Safety Rule) RFS 2001-01, published by the Institute for Radioprotection and Nuclear Safety, which uses more detailed seismotectonic zones. RFS 2001-01 replaced RFS I.2.c, published in 1981, however it has been criticised for continuing to require a deterministic assessment (rather than a probabilistic approach) that relies primarily on the strongest 'historically known' earthquake near a site. This leads to a number of problems including the short period (in geological timescales) for which there are records, the difficulty of assessing the characteristics of earthquakes that occurred prior to the use of seismometers, the difficulty of identifying the existence of all earthquakes that pre-date the historic record, and ultimately the reliance on one single earthquake scenario. Other criticisms include the use of intensity in the evaluation method, rather than spectral acceleration, which is commonly used elsewhere.

Public opinion

Following the 2011 Fukushima I nuclear accidents, an OpinionWay poll at the end of March found that 57% of the French population were opposed to nuclear energy in France. A TNS-Sofres poll in the days following the accident found 55% in favour of nuclear power. In 2006, BBC/GlobeScan poll found 57% of the French opposed to nuclear energy.

In May 2001, an Ipsos poll found that nearly 70% of the population had a 'good opinion' of nuclear power, however 56% also preferred not to live near a nuclear plant and the same proportion thought that a 'Chernobyl-like accident' could occur in France. 
The same Ipsos poll revealed that 50% thought that nuclear power was the best way of solving the problem of the greenhouse effect, while 88% thought this was a major reason for continuing to use nuclear power.

Historically the position has generally been favourable, with around two-thirds of the population strongly supporting nuclear power, while the Gaullists, the Socialist Party and the Communist Party were also all in favour.

When the Civaux Nuclear Power Plant was being constructed in 1997, it was claimed to be welcomed by the local community. A variety of reasons were cited for the popular support; a sense of national independence and reduced reliance on foreign oil, reduction of greenhouse gases, and a cultural interest in large technological projects (like the TGV, whose high-speed lines are powered by these plants, and Concorde).

Anti-nuclear movement

In the 1970s, an anti-nuclear movement in France, consisting of citizens' groups and political action committees, emerged. Between 1975 and 1977, some 175,000 people protested against nuclear power in ten demonstrations.

On 18 January 1982, Swiss environmental activist Chaïm Nissim fired five rockets on the Superphénix nuclear plant, then under construction. The rockets were launched at the incomplete containment building and caused damage, missing the reactor's empty core.

In January 2004, up to 15,000 anti-nuclear protesters marched in Paris against a new generation of nuclear reactors, the European Pressurised Reactor (EPR). On 17 March 2007, simultaneous protests, organised by Sortir du nucléaire, were staged in five French towns to protest against the construction of EPR plants.

After Japan's 2011 Fukushima nuclear disaster, thousands staged anti-nuclear protests around France, demanding reactors be closed. Protesters' demands were focused on getting France to shut its oldest nuclear power station at Fessenheim. Many people also protested at the Cattenom Nuclear Power Plant, France's second most powerful.

In November 2011, thousands of anti-nuclear protesters delayed a train carrying radioactive waste from France to Germany. Many clashes and obstructions made the journey the slowest one since the annual shipments of radioactive waste began in 1995.
Also in November 2011, a French court fined nuclear power giant Électricité de France €1.5m and jailed two senior employees for spying on Greenpeace, including hacking into Greenpeace's computer systems. Greenpeace was awarded €500,000 in damages.

On the first anniversary of the Fukushima nuclear disaster, organisers of French anti-nuclear demonstrations claim 60,000 supporters formed a human chain 230 kilometres long, stretching from Lyon to Avignon. Austrian Chancellor Werner Faymann expects anti-nuclear petition drives to start in at least six European Union countries in 2012 with the goal of having the EU abandon nuclear power.

In March 2014, police arrested 57 Greenpeace protesters who used a truck to break through security barriers and enter the Fessenheim nuclear in eastern France. The activists hung antinuclear banners, but France's nuclear safety authority said that the plant's security had not been compromised. Although President Hollande promised to close Fessenheim by 2016, this was delayed due to the late completion of Flamanville 3, with Fessenheim finally closed in June 2020.

Pro-nuclear movement

Voices of Nuclear (Voix du Nucléaire).

Environmental impact

In 2007, Areva NC claimed that, due to their reliance on nuclear power, France's carbon emissions per kWh are less than 1/10 that of Germany and the UK, and 1/13 that of Denmark, which has no nuclear plants. Its emissions of nitrogen oxide and sulfur dioxide have been reduced by 70% over 20 years, even though the total power output has tripled in that time.

If done without environmental or health over-sight, conventional mining for uranium can produce large amounts of mining tailings and contaminated water but as of 2010, about half of the world's uranium supply is increasingly generated from In situ recovery (ISR) technology, that does not require physical mining in the conventional sense and if responsibly operated is considerably cleaner. Another alternative to ISR is remote controlled underground mining, the French-owned Areva Resources Canada owns a large stake in the Canadian McArthur River uranium mine, the world's highest grade and largest uranium mine by output, the underground remote operation of mining vehicles in this mine, is designed to keep personnel exposure to rock particulates and radon gas etc. low. The mine is a frequent winner of the John T. Ryan National Safety Trophy award in Canada, which is bestowed upon the safest mine in the country every year.

According to the French embassy to the US, fission-electricity "helps to reduce French greenhouse gas emissions by avoiding the release of 31 billions tonnes of carbon dioxide (contrary to coal or gas generation) and making France the less carbon emitting country within the OECD". It further notes that, due to recycling of spent nuclear fuel, French fission-electric stations, produce 10 g/year/inhabitant of "nuclear waste", which is primarily fission products and other safety concerning solid decaying radioactive isotopes.

French environmentalist Bruno Comby started the group Environmentalists For Nuclear Energy in 1996, and said in 2005, "If well-managed, nuclear energy is very clean, does not create polluting gases in the atmosphere, produces very little waste and does not contribute to the greenhouse effect".

Air pollution

Unlike its neighboring countries of Germany, Italy and the United Kingdom, France does not rely very much on fossil fuels and biomass for electricity or home heating thanks to an abundance of cheap nuclear power.
Air pollution in France largely comes from cars and a minority is carried by the wind from Germany. 
Each year, the coal fired power stations in Germany are the cause of a calculated 1,860 premature domestic deaths and approximately 2,500 deaths abroad.

Electric vehicles
As the adoption of electric cars over internal combustion engine vehicles increases, France's comparatively cheap peak and off peak electricity prices could act as a strong customer incentive that may spur the speed of adoption of electric vehicles. This would essentially turn the current perceived glut of relatively cheap nuclear electricity into an asset, as demand for electric vehicle recharging stations becomes more and more commonplace.

Due to France's very low-carbon power electricity grid, the carbon dioxide emissions from charging an electric car from the French electricity grid are 12 g per km traveled. 
This compares favourably to the direct emissions of one of the most successful hybrid electric vehicles, the Toyota Prius, which produces carbon dioxide emissions at the higher rate of 105 g per km traveled.

Fusion research

The nuclear fusion project ITER is constructing the world's largest and most advanced experimental tokamak nuclear fusion reactor in the south of France. A collaboration between the European Union (EU), India, Japan, China, Russia, South Korea and the United States, the project aims to make a transition from experimental studies of plasma physics to electricity-producing fusion power plants. In 2005, Greenpeace International issued a press statement criticizing government funding of the ITER, believing the money should have been diverted to renewable energy sources and claiming that fusion energy would result in nuclear waste and nuclear weapons proliferation issues. A French association including about 700 anti-nuclear groups, Sortir du nucléaire (Get Out of Nuclear Energy), claimed that ITER was a hazard because scientists did not yet know how to manipulate the high-energy deuterium and tritium hydrogen isotopes used in the fusion process. According to most anti-nuclear groups, nuclear fusion power "remains a distant dream". The World Nuclear Association says that fusion "presents so far insurmountable scientific and engineering challenges". Construction of the ITER facility began in 2007, but the project has run into many delays and budget overruns. The facility is now not expected to begin operations until the year 2027 – 11 years after initially anticipated.

See also

 List of nuclear reactors – France
 Politics of France
 Nuclear energy policy
 Anti-nuclear movement in France
 Death of Sebastien Briat
 World Nuclear Industry Status Report

Companies
 Électricité de France (EdF)
 Commissariat à l'Energie Atomique (CEA)

References

Further reading
 Gabrielle Hecht, includes afterword by Hecht, foreword by Michel Callon, The Radiance of France: Nuclear Power and National Identity after World War II (Inside Technology series), The MIT Press, New Edition (31 July 2009), trade paperback, 496 pages, .
 Hardcover (lacks both the foreword and afterword that are in the trade paperback New Edition), The MIT Press; 1st edition (29 September 1998), .

External links

 French Nuclear Power Program by the World Nuclear Association
 The reality of France's aggressive nuclear power push in Bulletin of the Atomic Scientists
 Interview with 1984 U.S. Ambassador to France from the Dean Peter Krogh Foreign Affairs Digital Archives
 The World Nuclear Industry Status Reports website
 Radioactivity.eu.com – Nuclear Energie in France

 
Nuclear history of France